The 1936 Howard Bulldogs football team was an American football team that represented Howard College (now known as Samford University) as a member of the Dixie Conference during the 1936 college football season. In their second year under head coach Billy Bancroft, the team compiled a 5–3–1 record and finished as Dixie Conference champions.

Schedule

References

Howard
Samford Bulldogs football seasons
Howard Bulldogs football